Mohinder Singh Sayanwala is an Indian politician. He was elected to the Lok Sabha, lower house of the Parliament of India as a member of the Shiromani Akali Dal.

References

External links
 Official biographical sketch in Parliament of India website

India MPs 1977–1979
Lok Sabha members from Punjab, India
Shiromani Akali Dal politicians
1931 births
Living people